The Bearhead Sisters are a [Stoney Nakoda Wiyami] musical trio from Paul First Nation, Alberta, Canada, who won the Juno Award for Traditional Indigenous Artist of the Year at the Juno Awards of 2023 for their album Unbreakable.

The group, consisting of sisters Allie, Trina, and Carly Bearhead, perform traditional First Nations pow-wow music.

They are slated to appear in the upcoming third season of Canada's Got Talent.

References

First Nations musical groups
Musical groups from Alberta
Canada's Got Talent contestants
Juno Award for Traditional Indigenous Artist of the Year winners